Ricky Paul Bottalico (born August 26, 1969) is an American former professional baseball right-handed relief pitcher, who played in Major League Baseball (MLB) for the Philadelphia Phillies, St. Louis Cardinals, Kansas City Royals, Arizona Diamondbacks, New York Mets, and Milwaukee Brewers. He compiled a career 3.99 earned run average (ERA), with 116 saves.

Early life
Bottalico played for South Catholic High School in Hartford, Connecticut under coach Tom DiFiore. Bottalico went on to attend Florida Southern College before transferring to Central Connecticut State as a catcher. He was made a pitcher and eventually became the team's top reliever. Bottalico received little attention from scouts, went undrafted in the 1991 Major League Baseball draft, and played that summer for an insurance company in an amateur men's league in Connecticut. A Phillies scout saw him throwing  and signed him for $2,000.

Professional career
He made his Major League debut with the Phillies on July 29, 1994, against the Atlanta Braves at Atlanta–Fulton County Stadium. He pitched a scoreless inning in the 1996 Major League Baseball All-Star Game. On August 2, 1998, while pitching for the Phillies in a game against the San Francisco Giants, Bottalico hit Barry Bonds with a pitch, after which Bonds charged the mound in pursuit of Bottalico, igniting a bench-clearing brawl. The incident resulted in the ejection from the game of both players by home plate umpire Jeff Nelson. After suffering an elbow injury and clashing with manager Terry Francona, Bottalico was traded to the St. Louis Cardinals along with Garrett Stephenson in 1998.

After having spent the majority of his early career as a closer, Bottalico's saves dwindled to a total of five in his last five seasons.

As his playing career wound down, the Brewers released him in July 2005. Following a brief August trial with the Boston Red Sox’ AAA team, he was released again, later that month. In 2006, Bottalico was signed by the Baltimore Orioles to a minor-league contract and invited to spring training; however, he failed to make the team, and was released.

Throughout his career, Bottalico had many more games finished (301) than save opportunities (160).

Broadcasting
Bottalico is a commentator for Phillies Pregame Live and Phillies Postgame Live, appearing before and after Phillies broadcasts on NBC Sports Philadelphia. He also occasionally substitutes as the play-by-play commentator. Since August 1, 2022, he appears on "The Best Show Ever?" on 97.5 The Fanatic and NBC Sports Philadelphia.

References

External links

1969 births
Living people
Arizona Diamondbacks players
Baseball players from Connecticut
Central Connecticut Blue Devils baseball players
Clearwater Phillies players
Kansas City Royals players
Major League Baseball pitchers
Martinsville Phillies players
Milwaukee Brewers players
National League All-Stars
New York Mets players
Norfolk Tides players
Pawtucket Red Sox players
Philadelphia Phillies players
Reading Phillies players
Scranton/Wilkes-Barre Red Barons players
Spartanburg Phillies players
Sportspeople from New Britain, Connecticut
St. Louis Cardinals players
Tucson Sidewinders players
Philadelphia Phillies announcers